Willis Richardson (November 5, 1889 – November 7, 1977) was an American playwright.

Biography

Willis Richardson was born on November 5, 1889 in Wilmington, North Carolina, a son of Willis Wilder and Agnes Ann (Harper) Richardson. His family moved to Washington, D.C., shortly after the Wilmington Riots of 1898.

He attended public schools in Washington, DC including M Street High School (later Dunbar High School). While attending high school there, he was encouraged to write plays by Mary P. Burrill, one of his teachers and a playwright herself. Richardson worked as a "skilled helper" in the wetting division of the Bureau of Engraving and Printing beginning on 8 March 1911.

On September 1, 1914, he married Mary Ellen Jones and they had three children:

 Jean Paula Richardson (August 7, 1916–)
 Shirley Antonella Richardson (April 29, 1918–)
 Noel Justine Richardson (August 14, 1920–)

In 1921, The Deacon's Awakening was Richardson's first play to be staged. It was presented in Saint Paul, Minnesota.

He died on November 7, 1977, in Washington, D.C. During his 30-year career, he had written children's fairy tales, histories, and domestic plays that number 48 in total.

Plays and productions
After The Deacon's Awakening in 1921, Richardson's next play to be staged was The Chip Woman's Fortune, which was produced by Raymond O'Neil's Ethiopian Art Players in Chicago, Washington, D.C., and became the first non-musical production by an African American on Broadway.

His play Mortgaged was presented in 1923 by the Howard Players at Howard University. It was subsequently produced by the Dunbar Players in Plainfield, New Jersey, in 1924. The Deacon's Awakening was staged August 30-September 6, 2015 by Xoregos Performing Company in its Songs of the Harlem River program in NYC's Dream Up Festival. Songs of the Harlem River opened the Langston Hughes Festival in Queens, New York on February 13, 2016.

The Broken Banjo
The characters that appear in The Broken Banjo are Emma, Matt, Sam, and Adam. The play begins with Sam, the brother of Emma, accusing Matt, Emma's husband, of murder. During the visit to Emma's house, broke Matt's banjo and enraged Matt when he returned home. In retaliation, Sam reveals that he saw Matt killing Shelton with a rock. Matt decided to locked Sam and Adam in the house until they made a pledge on the bible not to tell anyone about the murder. Emma tells Matt that they should move to another city as she didn't trust that the two would not keep their pledge. As Matt was planning to leave, Sam and Adam had brought an officer to arrest Matt.

Honors
Richardson was awarded the Amy Spingarn Prize in 1925 for The Broken Banjo, his best known work. In addition, the play took first place in a contest held by The Crisis magazine in March 1925, where the play was published. First place prize was $75. The following year he received the Spingarn Prize for Bootblack Lover, a drama in three acts. He was awarded the prestigious AUDELCO prize posthumously for his contribution to American theatre.

Personal life 
Richardson was Catholic.

Selected works

References

Yenser, Thomas (editor), Who's Who in Colored America: A Biographical Dictionary of Notable Living Persons of African Descent in America, Who's Who in Colored America, Brooklyn, New York, 1930-1931-1932 (Third Edition)

External links
The Black Renaissance in Washington, DC
African American Registry
African American Heritage Trail 
Willis Richardson papers, 1910-1974, held by the Billy Rose Theatre Division, New York Public Library for the Performing Arts

1889 births
African-American dramatists and playwrights
1977 deaths
Writers from Wilmington, North Carolina
Writers from Washington, D.C.
20th-century American dramatists and playwrights
Dunbar High School (Washington, D.C.) alumni
20th-century African-American writers
African-American Catholics